The 1880 Alabama gubernatorial election took place on August 2, 1880, in order to elect the governor of Alabama. Incumbent Democrat Rufus W. Cobb ran for reelection to a second term.

Results

References

1880
gubernatorial
Alabama
August 1880 events